Clarence Edward "Bud" Phillips (born April 8, 1950) is an American politician. A Democrat, he served 11 terms in the Virginia House of Delegates, 1990–2012. He represented a portion of southwestern Virginia that at times included parts of Dickenson, Russell, Tazewell and Wise counties and the independent city of Norton. Phillips elected not to run for a 12th term when his constituency, the 2nd district, was moved to the northern part of the state in a 2011 redistricting.

References

External links

1950 births
Living people
Democratic Party members of the Virginia House of Delegates
University of Virginia's College at Wise alumni
East Tennessee State University alumni
People from Russell County, Virginia
People from Clintwood, Virginia
21st-century American politicians